Kalara is a census town in Domjur CD Block of Howrah Sadar subdivision in Howrah district in the Indian state of West Bengal. It is a part of Kolkata Urban Agglomeration.

Geography
Kalara is located at 

It is broadly subdivided into four zones
 South Kolorah, has a madrasah named Majahirul Ulum Islamia Senior Madrasah, Karbala G M Primary School and Kolorah Haji Abdul Ohab Institution. There is a market named Karbala Bazar and one Primary Health Centre.
 North Kolorah, has a Bazar, Kolorah High School and a Madrasah.
 Maddhya (Middle) Kolorah
 New Kolorah

Demographics
As per 2011 Census of India Kalara had a total population of 27,210 of which 14,102 (52%) were males and 13,108 (48%) were females. Population below 6 years was 3,304. The total number of literates in Kalara was 19,309 (80.77% of the population over 6 years).

 India census, Kalara had a population of 23,129. Males constitute 52% of the population and females 48%. Kalara has an average literacy rate of 64%, higher than the national average of 59.5%: male literacy is 68% and female literacy is 60%. In Kalara, 14% of the population is under 6 years of age.

Most of the people of Kolorah are zari workers and some are tailors by profession, they work in Kolkata Barabazar.

Transport
Domjur Road railway station and Sankrail railway station are the nearest railway stations.

References 

Cities and towns in Howrah district
Neighbourhoods in Kolkata
Kolkata Metropolitan Area